Walter Preston may refer to:

 Sir Walter Preston (British politician) (1875–1946), Conservative Member of Parliament 1918–1923 and 1928–1937
 Walter Preston (American politician) representative from Virginia at the First Confederate Congress
 Walter W. Preston (died 1951), American politician and judge